

Preliminaries

Group A

Group B

Group C

Group D

Main tournament

Group A

Group B

Key:
Green – Winner of group; earns a spot in the challenger final.
Blue – Earns a place in the next edition's group stage.
Red – Eliminated from automatic berth; must qualify through preliminary stages.

Challenger finals

Finals

Kisei (Go)
2002 in go